Elk Creek may refer to:

Places

Communities
Elk Creek, California, community in Glenn County
Elk Creek, Kentucky
Elk Creek, Nebraska
Elk Creek, Virginia
Elk Creek, Wisconsin
Elk Creek Township (disambiguation)

Streams
Elk Creek (California), watercourse in Colusa County
Elk Creek (Turkey River), a river in Iowa
Elk Creek (Kansas), a river in Kansas
Elk Creek (Rock River), a stream in Minnesota
Elk Creek (Gasconade River), a stream in Missouri
Elk Creek (Niobrara River tributary), a stream in Rock County, Nebraska
Elk Creek (New York)
Elk Creek (Rogue River), a stream in Oregon
Elk Creek (Umpqua River), a stream in Oregon
Elk Creek (Lake Erie), Pennsylvania
Elk Creek (Loyalsock Creek), Pennsylvania 
Elk Creek (Penns Creek), Pennsylvania
Elk Creek (South Dakota)
Elk Creek (West Virginia)